Gregbrownia fulgens, synonym Mezobromelia fulgens, is a species of flowering plant in the family Bromeliaceae. It is endemic to Ecuador. It grows in the páramo and high-elevation forest of the Andes. It is terrestrial or grows as an epiphyte.

There are five known subpopulations of this bromeliad. It is threatened by loss of habitat to agriculture.

References

Tillandsioideae
Endangered plants
Endemic flora of Ecuador
Páramo flora
Taxonomy articles created by Polbot